Henry Reed Rathbone (July 1, 1837 – August 14, 1911) was a United States military officer and diplomat who was present at the assassination of President Abraham Lincoln. Rathbone was sitting with his fiancée, Clara Harris, next to the president and his wife, Mary Todd Lincoln, when John Wilkes Booth entered the president's box at Ford's Theatre and fatally shot Lincoln in the head. When Rathbone attempted to prevent Booth from fleeing the scene, Booth stabbed and seriously wounded him.

Early life and military career
Henry Rathbone was born in Albany, New York, one of four children of Jared L. Rathbone, a merchant and wealthy businessman who later became Albany's first elected mayor, and Pauline Rathbone (née Penney). Upon his father's death in 1845, Rathbone inherited . His widowed mother married Ira Harris in 1848. Harris was appointed U.S. Senator from New York after William H. Seward became Lincoln's Secretary of State. Harris was a widower with four children whose wife, Louisa, had also died in 1845. As a result of this marriage, Ira Harris became Rathbone's stepfather, and his daughter, Clara, became Rathbone's stepsister. Rathbone and Clara Harris formed a close friendship and later fell in love. The two became engaged shortly before the American Civil War.

Rathbone studied law at Union College, where he was known to miss many classes, and worked in a law partnership in Albany. In 1858, he entered the New York National Guard, where he worked as a judge advocate. Shortly after this, he was selected to be sent to Europe as an observer during the Second Italian War for Independence. He entered the Union Army at the start of the American Civil War and served as a captain in the 12th Infantry Regiment at the Battle of Antietam and the Battle of Fredericksburg. In 1863, he was pulled from frontline duty and given a desk job. By the war's end, he had attained the rank of major.

Lincoln assassination

On April 14, 1865, Rathbone and Harris accepted an invitation from Lincoln and his wife to see a play at Ford's Theatre. Rathbone and Harris had been friends with the president and his wife for some time and were invited after Ulysses S. Grant and his wife, Julia, and several others had declined Mrs. Lincoln's invitation.

During the play, at about 10:14 pm, noted stage actor John Wilkes Booth entered the presidential box and fatally shot Lincoln in the head with a pistol. As Rathbone attempted to apprehend Booth, Booth slashed Rathbone's left arm with a dagger from the elbow to his shoulder. Rathbone later recalled that he was horrified at the anger on Booth's face. Rathbone again grabbed at Booth as Booth prepared to jump from the sill of the box. He grabbed onto Booth's coat, causing Booth to fall awkwardly to the stage, perhaps breaking his leg, though some conspiracy theorists said that the injury did not occur until later. Booth nonetheless escaped and remained at large for twelve days.

Despite his serious wound, Rathbone escorted Mary Lincoln to the Petersen House across the street, where the president had been taken.
Shortly thereafter, he passed out due to blood loss. Harris arrived soon after and held Rathbone's head in her lap while he lay semiconscious. When surgeon Charles Leale, who had been attending Lincoln, finally examined Rathbone, it was realized that his wound was more serious than initially thought. Booth had cut him nearly to the bone and severed an artery. Rathbone was taken home while Harris remained with Mary Lincoln as the president lay dying over the next eight hours. This death vigil lasted through the night until Lincoln died at 7:22 a.m.

Later life
Although Rathbone's physical wounds healed, his mental state deteriorated in the years following Lincoln's death as he anguished over his perceived inability to thwart the assassination. He married Harris on July 11, 1867, and the couple had three children: Henry Riggs (born February 12, 1870), who later became a U.S. Congressman; Gerald Lawrence (born August 26, 1871); and Clara Pauline (born September 15, 1872).

Rathbone rose to the rank of brevet colonel. After his resignation, he struggled to find and keep a job due to his mental instability. He became convinced that Harris was unfaithful and resented the attention she paid their children. He reportedly threatened her on several occasions after suspecting that she was going to divorce him and take the children. He made multiple unsuccessful attempts to obtain a position as a U.S. consul to a European city. Rumors exist that Rathbone was appointed the U.S. consul to Hanover, Germany, but the U.S. never established diplomatic relations with Hanover. Rathbone's brother, Jared Lawrence Rathbone, was the consul to Paris in 1887 during the Cleveland administration.

Rathbone and his family relocated to Germany, where his mental health continued to decline. On December 23, 1883, he attacked his children in a fit of madness. He fatally shot and stabbed his wife, who was attempting to protect the children. He stabbed himself five times in the chest in an attempted suicide. He was charged with murder, but was declared insane by doctors after he blamed the murder on an intruder. He was convicted and committed to an asylum for the criminally insane in Hildesheim, Germany. The couple's children were sent to live with their uncle, William Harris, in the United States.

Rathbone spent the rest of his life in the asylum.

Depictions
On film and television Rathbone has been portrayed by:
 Earl Schenck in The Dramatic Life of Abraham Lincoln (1924)
 Lloyd Whitlock in The Prisoner of Shark Island (1936)
 Steve Darrell in Prince of Players (1955)
 John Cooler in The Lincoln Conspiracy (1977)
 Sean Baldwin in The Day Lincoln Was Shot (1998)
 Andy Martin in The Conspirator (2010)
 Joseph Carlson in Killing Lincoln (2013)
 Luke Wilson in The Ridiculous 6 (2015)

The biography of Henry Rathbone, his experience at the Lincoln Assassination and the murder of Clara Harris is covered in the non-fiction book Worst Seat in the House: Henry Rathbone's Front Row View of the Lincoln Assassination by Caleb Stephens.

Rathbone and Harris are also the subjects of Henry and Clara (1994, published by Ticknor & Fields), a historical fiction novel by Thomas Mallon.

References

External links
 

1837 births
1911 deaths
1883 murders in Europe
American consuls
American expatriates in Germany
American murderers
American people imprisoned abroad
Burials in Lower Saxony
Deaths in mental institutions
People acquitted by reason of insanity
People associated with the assassination of Abraham Lincoln
Military personnel from Albany, New York
People of New York (state) in the American Civil War
People convicted of murder by Germany
Union Army officers
Union College (New York) alumni
Lawyers from Albany, New York
Uxoricides
19th-century American diplomats